Branko Geroski (Macedonian Cyrillic: Бранко Героски) is chief editor of daily newspaper Sloboden Pechat in North Macedonia.

Controversy
Geroski is known to express his opinion through social media, like Facebook and this has led to accusations of attacks on fellow citizens. Journalist Sashe Ivanovski has claimed that most of the funds from the Foundation for open Society end up at Geroski's newspaper Sloboden Pechat

Bibliography
Geroski has written three books:
Be a Journalist
Journalistic Sentence
Learn to write

See also
Sloboden Pechat
Dnevnik

References

Living people
1962 births
Macedonian journalists
Male journalists